Encore, Once More Encore! is a 1992 post-war eccentric tragi-comedy set at the end of the Forties and the beginning of the Fifties. Release in the US took place October 10, 1992.

The film has won 5 awards, including The Best Film Nika Award, 1993.

Plot
In a distant garrison town, life proceeds at a measured pace. The officers drink and debauch, while the soldiers serve. Meanwhile, the accidentally unleashed human emotions are suffocated by the atmosphere of cruelty and hypocrisy.

Lt. Poletaev (Yevgeny Mironov) is an irrepressible character. Even the grim nature of service in the Red Army following World War II isn't enough to dampen his spirits. Instead, he keeps things lively by accompanying the base's chorus on his accordion, and by attempting to get women to join the chorus. He succeeds in both his aims. Not only that, but he also has romantic chemistry with one of the female singers (Irina Rozanova). Unfortunately for him, she is the live-in lover of his boss, Col. Vinogradov (Valentin Gaft).

Cast
Valentin Gaft as Colonel Vinogradov
Irina Rozanova as Lyuba Antipova
Yevgeny Mironov as Lieutenant Vladimir Poletaev
Elena Yakovleva as Anya Kryukova
Sergey Nikonenko as Captain Ivan Kryukov
Larisa Malevannaya as Vinogradov's wife
Andrey Ilin as sergeant
Vladimir Ilyin as Captain Liкhovol, intendant
Lyudmila Gnilova as Barkhatova
Stanislav Govorukhin as divisional commander

Production
"I made a film about love. About a Lieutenant, who fell in love with a Colonel's young and beautiful wife. The Colonel' s got two wives: the first from the pre-war times and the second whom he met in the war and fell head over heels. Pangs of conscience, painful doubts, sidelong glances. Only shot in the head can cleave this knot.", says director Pyotr Todorovsky.

References

External links

Movie Trailer and Screenshots

1992 films
1990s Russian-language films
Films directed by Pyotr Todorovsky
Russian drama films
1992 drama films
Mosfilm films